Prasoon Joshi (born 16 September 1971) is an Indian poet, writer, lyricist, screenwriter, communication specialist and marketer. He is the CEO of McCann World group India and Chairman APAC (Asia Pacific), a subsidiary of the global marketing firm McCann Erickson. He was appointed as the Chairperson of the Central Board of Film Certification on 11 August 2017.

Prasoon has received the Filmfare Best Lyricist Award three times, in 2007 and 2008 and again in 2014 for the Hindi movie Bhaag Milkha Bhaag. He has also received the National Film Award for Best Lyrics twice, for his work in Taare Zameen Par (2007), and Chittagong (2013). He was awarded Padma Shri by the Government of India in 2015, for his contributions towards the field of Arts, Literature and Advertising. He is one of the trustees of IGNCA, a member of Nehru Memorial Museum & Library Society Panel and is among the select 120 members of the National Committee for Commemoration of 150th Birth Anniversary of Mahatma Gandhi.

Early life and education
Prasoon Joshi spent his earliest years in the north Indian state of Uttarakhand (then part of Uttar Pradesh). His father, D.K. Joshi, was the Additional Director of the state's Education Service. These early years all across the northern India – and spending time in places like Almora, Nainital (where his extended family and relatives still live), Tehri, Chamoli Gopeshwar, and later Rampur, Meerut and Delhi – gave Prasoon a remarkable feel for the real Indian pulse that he is now celebrated for in his screenplays, dialogues, lyrics, and advertising. His mother, Sushma Joshi, a lecturer in political science, performed for the All India Radio for over three decades. His parents are qualified classical vocalists and daily home life for the young Prasoon was marked with academic discipline, a rich vein of the artistic life and a strong sense of music and culture.

He started writing early in life and published his first book at age 17, Main Aur Woh, a 'conversation with himself'. Two more books Dard So Raha Hai and Samadhan followed establishing him as an author.

His book, Sunshine Lanes, a collection of his songs, was launched at the Jaipur Literature Festival in January 2013.
Prasoon's latest book ‘Thinking Aloud’  a collection of essays on emerging India was published in 2016.

Prasoon did his BSc and post graduation in Physics, then elected to pursue an MBA from Institute Of Management Technology, Ghaziabad. During his MBA education he decided to fuse his love for culture and art and his faculty for the commercial dynamic and make his career in advertising.

Advertising
Prasoon started his career with Ogilvy & Mather in Delhi. In just 10 years, he was appointed the Executive Creative Director of the Mumbai office. In early 2002, he joined McCann-Erickson as Executive Vice-President and National Creative Director. By 2006, he was the Regional Creative Director for South and South East Asia. In December 2006 he was promoted to Executive Chairman for McCann Worldgroup India and Regional Creative Director for Asia Pacific.

Joshi is known for creating brand-building work for multinational brands including Nestle, Coca cola, Microsoft, Mastercard, L’Oréal, Intel X Box, Reckitt Benckiser, Unilever, Perfetti, J&J, as well as Indian Brands like Britannia, Saffola, Dabur, ITC foods, TVS motors, Reliance, Reliance Jio, Paytm, RadioMirchi, and media brands like  NDTV India (Sach dikhate hain hum), Times Now, CNBC, CNN IBN, and the Cannes-winning Thanda matlab Coca-Cola campaign with Aamir Khan. 

His Happydent television commercial was listed by Bob Garfield of AdvertisingAge as one of his personal choices for the Cannes Gold in 2007, and it was chosen by a Gunn Report poll as one of the 20 best ads of the 21st century.

His works were utilized for various social campaigns in India: Swacch Bharat, education, polio eradication, malnutrition, women empowerment, child rights, against student suicide, and UN millennium goals. His contribution was acknowledged for the 2014, and subsequently 2019 elections.

Film career

Prasoon made his debut as a film lyricist with Rajkumar Santoshi's Lajja, a critical and commercial success, and this soon led to Yash Chopra's Hum Tum and a string of highly successful Bollywood films like Fanaa, Rang De Basanti, Taare Zameen Par, Black and Delhi 6. With Rang De Basanti (2006), he also became a dialogue writer.

He won the Filmfare Best Lyricist Award for "Chand Sifarish" from the film Fanaa in 2007 and for "Maa" from  Taare Zameen Par in 2008. He has won the prestigious National Award twice. The first for his work in Taare Zameen Par and the second one in 2013 for Chittagong.

He has also written the script for the award-winning 2014 film Bhaag Milkha Bhaag.

As a CBFC chairman he has maintained the fine balance between the filmmakers and societal sensitivities, instituted dialogue discussion instead of controversy and has played a big role in digitising CBFC functionality.

Global and national recognition
In 2008, he was invited as the Cannes Jury chairman and in 2009, he was named among the exclusive 10-member Cannes Titanium and Integrated Jury at the Cannes Lions International Advertising Festival. In 2006, he was chosen a 'Young Global Leader 2006' by the Forum of Young Global Leaders, an affiliate of the World Economic Forum, In 2007, he was asked to be a judge of the nationally popular reality singing competition Dhoom Macha De on NDTV Imagine. Joshi was part of the select three-member Core Creative Advisory Committee for the Commonwealth Games 2010 opening and closing ceremonies, with Shyam Benegal and Javed Akhtar.

Social theme work
Tata Jagriti Anthem
Dettol Swachh Bharat 
Poshan Anthem

Filmography

Manikarnika: The Queen of Jhansi (2019)
 Vishwaroop II (2018)  
Neerja (2016)
Margarita With A Straw (2015)
Satyagraha (2013)
Bhaag Milkha Bhaag (2013)
Ishkq in Paris (2012)
Teri Meri Kahaani (2012)
Aarakshan (2011)
Break Ke Baad (2010)
Sikandar (2009)
London Dreams (2009)
Delhi 6 (2009)
Ghajini (2008)
Thoda Pyaar Thoda Magic (2008)
Taare Zameen Par (2007)
Fanaa (2006)
Rang De Basanti (2006)
Black (2005)
Rok Sako To Rok Lo (2004)
Phir Milenge (2004)
Hum Tum (2004)
Aankhen (2002)
Kyon? (2003)
Love at Times Square (2003)
Lajja (2001)
Bhopal Express (1999)

When Prasoon watched the film Sikander, he was inspired by it and wrote a song called "Dhoop ke sikke". Later, this song was incorporated in the film.

Private albums
He has been the lyricist for several Indipop albums which have been hits:
Mann Ke Manjeere, an album on women's dreams for human rights organisation Breakthrough, sung by Shubha Mudgal (2000)
Ab Ke Saawan for Shubha Mudgal (1999)
Dooba Dooba Rehta Hoon for Silk Route

Short films on malnutrition
Prasoon Joshi and Aamir Khan have decided to prepare 50 short films on malnutrition after being invited by the prime minister of India. According to Mr. Joshi, Aamir and himself got along well because they do not compromise their work.

Awards
He was awarded Padma Shri, the fourth highest civilian award of India, in 2015.

Personal life
Prasoon's wife Aparna works in the field of preserving and promoting Indian classical and folk music and is the co-founder of the India Music Summit. They have been married for over a decade and have a daughter named Aishaanya.

References

External links
A poem by Prasoon on Ayodhya
A poem by Prasoon: The girl is talking to her father
Prasoon Joshi Exposes Indian Ad Industry

1971 births
Indian copywriters
Filmfare Awards winners
Hindi-language writers
Indian lyricists
Indian male screenwriters
Living people
People from Almora
Institute of Management Technology, Ghaziabad alumni
Recipients of the Padma Shri in arts
Screenwriters from Uttarakhand
20th-century Indian dramatists and playwrights
20th-century Indian male writers
Best Lyrics National Film Award winners